Yaba is a suburb located on Lagos Mainland, Lagos in Lagos State, Nigeria. There are several federal government institutions in the area, which include Queen's College, the Nigerian Institute of Medical Research, the Yaba College of Technology, Igbobi College, the University of Lagos, the Federal Science and Technical College, and the Federal College of Education (Technical) Akoka.

Yaba has one of the busiest market sites in Lagos, known as Tejuosho Market. The old Tejuosho market was demolished in 2008 and rebuilt into a modern shopping complex by the end of 2014. Directly opposite the Yaba market is a psychiatric hospital popularly known by many Lagosians as Yaba Left.

Yaba is one of the go-to places for technology renaissance in Africa, with tech startups such as Hotels.ng, Andela, Cc-Hub and many others with a positive impact on the economy. The redevelopment of the Tejuosho Market, which was undertaken as part of the Lagos Megacity Project, has transformed it into a major shopping center for Lagosians. The market complex houses various facilities including boutiques, food stores, and a sports center.

History 
Yaba Local council Development area was carved out of the old Lagos Mainland Local government area, which was created in 1977 as a separate Local government following the national reform of Local governments in September 1976. Lagos Mainland was carved out of Lagos city council which administered the Lagos Metropolitan city consisting of Lagos Island and Lagos Mainland. With the creation of three more Local governments on 27 August 1991, the former Lagos mainland was re-constituted with Surulere carved out of it. Yaba Local council Development area was one of the 37 newly created Local council Development areas created out of Lagos Mainland by the administration of Senator Bola Ahmed Tinubu, after the state assembly passed a law creating new Local council Development areas.

Notable institutions
 University of Lagos
 Yaba College of Technology 
 Nigerian Institute of Medical Research 
 Nigeria Centre For Disease Control Central Public Health Library
 Infectious Disease Hospital, Yaba
 68 Nigeria Army Reference Hospital
 Lagos University Teaching Hospital Annex
 Federal College of Education, Yaba
 West African Examination Council
West African College of Surgeons
 Methodist Girls High School, Yaba
 Ozone Cinemas
 Queen's College Yaba
 All Saints Anglican Church, Yaba
 St. Finbarr's College
 Our Lady of Apostle Secondary School, Yaba

Yabacon Valley 
Yabacon Valley is a nickname for an area within Yaba. It is a portmanteau of 'Yaba' and 'Silicon', a chemical element used to create most semiconductors commercially for electronic computers. The name is an imitation of America's Silicon valley.

It is not known if the term Yabacon Valley has been mentioned or used in reference of this tech cluster in the past, but its first published use is credited to The Business Aim. According to Google search results, the name was first used by Blaise Aboh as part of a title for an article on a new technology startup.

The emergence of Yaba as a startup cluster 
In 2011, Wennovation Hub in partnership with African Leadership Forum started incubating startups in the tech ecosystem.

The tech space in yaba became popular in late 2011 when Bosun Tijani and colleagues founded Cc-HUB, and it became one of Nigeria's pioneer startup incubator. With investment and support from organisations such as the Indigo Trust, Omidyar Network, MainOne Cable Company and the Lagos State government, it soon gained momentum and proceeded to install a fibre-optic-powered information superhighway. In 2011, former banker Seun Onigbinde co-founded BudgIT, a fiscal transparency project, on the third floor of CC Hub's six-storey building in Yaba. As one of the first early-stage startups to benefit from CC Hub's incubation drive in 2011, it received $5,000 of its $90,000 seed funding from billionaire businessman Tony Elumelu. Big names like Konga, eCommerce company valued at approximately $200 million as after raising $20 million in Series C rounds, arrived in 2013, while Africa Internet Group which has $469 million in 4 Rounds from six investors transferred six of its companies to Yaba in 2014. In same 2014 BudgIT received $400,000 grant from Omidyar. Mid 2016, Andela – a Nigerian-founded talent accelerator for programmers that has campuses in Lagos, Nairobi and New York – received $24 million in investment from the Chan Zuckerberg Initiative. In 2015, Hotels.ng, a hotel booking site in Nigeria secured $1.2 million in funding from Omidyar Network to expand its listings across Africa.

In August 2016, Mark Zuckerberg visited Nigeria, and specifically Yaba. A day after Zuckerberg's visit to Yaba, local and international media went agog as to why Yaba is 'Nigeria's Silicon Valley'.

Photo gallery

See also
 Yabacon Valley
 Yaba monkey tumor virus

References

Geography of Lagos
Neighborhoods of Lagos